Neil Edward Wohlwend (May 12, 1913 – February 8, 1978) was an American football and basketball coach and member of the Minnesota House of Representatives.

Background
Wohlwend was born in Barnesville, Minnesota and was involved in the insurance business. He served in the United States Navy and went to graduated school at University of Minnesota.

Career
He served as the head football coach at Minnesota State University at Moorhead from 1946 to 1948 before embarking on a career in politics. Wohlwend served as a Minnesota state representative from 1973 to 1974.

References

External links
 Minnesota Legislature profile
 Northwest Minnesota Historical Center profile
 

1913 births
1978 deaths
Basketball coaches from Minnesota
Minnesota State–Moorhead Dragons football coaches
Minnesota State–Moorhead Dragons men's basketball coaches
High school football coaches in Minnesota
Minnesota State University Moorhead alumni
University of Minnesota alumni
People from Clay County, Minnesota
Players of American football from Minnesota
Members of the Minnesota House of Representatives
Military personnel from Minnesota